The arrondissement of Mont-de-Marsan is an arrondissement of France in the Landes départment in the Nouvelle-Aquitaine region. It has 175 communes. Its surface area of over  km² is the largest of any arrondissement in Metropolitan France, its size being comparable to an entire département such as the Eure.

Composition

The communes of the arrondissement of Mont-de-Marsan, and their INSEE codes, are:

 Aire-sur-l'Adour (40001)
 Arboucave (40005)
 Arengosse (40006)
 Argelouse (40008)
 Artassenx (40012)
 Arthez-d'Armagnac (40013)
 Arue (40014)
 Arx (40015)
 Aubagnan (40016)
 Audignon (40017)
 Aureilhan (40019)
 Aurice (40020)
 Bahus-Soubiran (40022)
 Banos (40024)
 Bascons (40025)
 Bas-Mauco (40026)
 Bats (40029)
 Baudignan (40030)
 Belhade (40032)
 Bélis (40033)
 Benquet (40037)
 Betbezer-d'Armagnac (40039)
 Bias (40043)
 Biscarrosse (40046)
 Bordères-et-Lamensans (40049)
 Bostens (40050)
 Bougue (40051)
 Bourdalat (40052)
 Bourriot-Bergonce (40053)
 Bretagne-de-Marsan (40055)
 Brocas (40056)
 Buanes (40057)
 Cachen (40058)
 Callen (40060)
 Campagne (40061)
 Campet-et-Lamolère (40062)
 Canenx-et-Réaut (40064)
 Castandet (40070)
 Castelnau-Tursan (40072)
 Castelner (40073)
 Cauna (40076)
 Cazalis (40079)
 Cazères-sur-l'Adour (40080)
 Cère (40081)
 Classun (40082)
 Clèdes (40083)
 Commensacq (40085)
 Coudures (40086)
 Créon-d'Armagnac (40087)
 Duhort-Bachen (40091)
 Dumes (40092)
 Escalans (40093)
 Escource (40094)
 Estigarde (40096)
 Eugénie-les-Bains (40097)
 Eyres-Moncube (40098)
 Fargues (40099)
 Le Frêche (40100)
 Gabarret (40102)
 Gaillères (40103)
 Garein (40105)
 Gastes (40108)
 Geaune (40110)
 Geloux (40111)
 Grenade-sur-l'Adour (40117)
 Hagetmau (40119)
 Haut-Mauco (40122)
 Herré (40124)
 Hontanx (40127)
 Horsarrieu (40128)
 Labastide-Chalosse (40130)
 Labastide-d'Armagnac (40131)
 Labouheyre (40134)
 Labrit (40135)
 Lacajunte (40136)
 Lacquy (40137)
 Lacrabe (40138)
 Laglorieuse (40139)
 Lagrange (40140)
 Larrivière-Saint-Savin (40145)
 Latrille (40146)
 Lauret (40148)
 Lencouacq (40149)
 Lesperon (40152)
 Liposthey (40156)
 Losse (40158)
 Lubbon (40161)
 Lucbardez-et-Bargues (40162)
 Lüe (40163)
 Luglon (40165)
 Lussagnet (40166)
 Luxey (40167)
 Maillas (40169)
 Maillères (40170)
 Mano (40171)
 Mant (40172)
 Mauries (40174)
 Maurrin (40175)
 Mauvezin-d'Armagnac (40176)
 Mazerolles (40178)
 Mézos (40182)
 Mimizan (40184)
 Miramont-Sensacq (40185)
 Momuy (40188)
 Monget (40189)
 Monségur (40190)
 Montaut (40191)
 Mont-de-Marsan (40192)
 Montégut (40193)
 Montgaillard (40195)
 Montsoué (40196)
 Morcenx-la-Nouvelle (40197)
 Morganx (40198)
 Moustey (40200)
 Onesse-Laharie (40210)
 Ousse-Suzan (40215)
 Parentis-en-Born (40217)
 Parleboscq (40218)
 Payros-Cazautets (40219)
 Pécorade (40220)
 Perquie (40221)
 Peyre (40223)
 Philondenx (40225)
 Pimbo (40226)
 Pissos (40227)
 Pontenx-les-Forges (40229)
 Poudenx (40232)
 Pouydesseaux (40234)
 Pujo-le-Plan (40238)
 Puyol-Cazalet (40239)
 Renung (40240)
 Retjons (40164)
 Rimbez-et-Baudiets (40242)
 Roquefort (40245)
 Sabres (40246)
 Saint-Agnet (40247)
 Saint-Avit (40250)
 Saint-Cricq-Chalosse (40253)
 Saint-Cricq-Villeneuve (40255)
 Sainte-Colombe (40252)
 Sainte-Eulalie-en-Born (40257)
 Sainte-Foy (40258)
 Saint-Gein (40259)
 Saint-Gor (40262)
 Saint-Julien-d'Armagnac (40265)
 Saint-Justin (40267)
 Saint-Loubouer (40270)
 Saint-Martin-d'Oney (40274)
 Saint-Maurice-sur-Adour (40275)
 Saint-Paul-en-Born (40278)
 Saint-Perdon (40280)
 Saint-Pierre-du-Mont (40281)
 Saint-Sever (40282)
 Samadet (40286)
 Sanguinet (40287)
 Sarbazan (40288)
 Sarraziet (40289)
 Sarron (40290)
 Saugnacq-et-Muret (40295)
 Le Sen (40297)
 Serres-Gaston (40298)
 Serreslous-et-Arribans (40299)
 Solférino (40303)
 Sorbets (40305)
 Sore (40307)
 Trensacq (40319)
 Uchacq-et-Parentis (40320)
 Urgons (40321)
 Vert (40323)
 Vielle-Soubiran (40327)
 Vielle-Tursan (40325)
 Le Vignau (40329)
 Villeneuve-de-Marsan (40331)
 Ychoux (40332)
 Ygos-Saint-Saturnin (40333)

History

The arrondissement of Mont-de-Marsan was created in 1800.

As a result of the reorganisation of the cantons of France which came into effect in 2015, the borders of the cantons are no longer related to the borders of the arrondissements. The cantons of the arrondissement of Mont-de-Marsan were, as of January 2015:

 Aire-sur-l'Adour
 Gabarret
 Geaune
 Grenade-sur-l'Adour
 Hagetmau
 Labrit
 Mimizan
 Mont-de-Marsan-Nord
 Mont-de-Marsan-Sud
 Morcenx
 Parentis-en-Born
 Pissos
 Roquefort
 Sabres
 Saint-Sever
 Sore
 Villeneuve-de-Marsan

References

Mont-de-Marsan